Ga–Dangme may refer to:

 Ga–Dangme people, an ethnic group in Ghana and Togo
 Ga–Dangme languages, a language family spoken in Ghana and Togo

See also

 Dangme language
 Ga language

Language and nationality disambiguation pages